Lindsey Tichenor is an American politician from Kentucky. She is a Republican and has represented District 6 in the Kentucky Senate since January 1, 2023. Tichenor is a realtor, and she resides in Smithfield, Kentucky. According to her website, "Lindsey is a realtor, former missionary and disaster relief organizer, grass roots community mobilizer, sales executive, and teacher."

References 

21st-century American politicians
Living people
Republican Party Kentucky state senators
Women state legislators in Kentucky
21st-century American women politicians